Samuel Dennis, D.D., was an English academic administrator at the University of Oxford.

Dennis was elected President (head) of St John's College, Oxford in 1772, a post he held until 1795. During his time at St John's College, more rooms were added on the north side of the college. Dennis was also Vice-Chancellor of Oxford University from 1780 until 1784.

A monument was erected in the college to his memory in 1795, sculpted by Richard Westmacott (the elder).

References

Year of birth missing
Year of death missing
Presidents of St John's College, Oxford
Vice-Chancellors of the University of Oxford